Harwell Glacier is a steep-walled tributary glacier,  long, descending the north slopes of the Prince Olav Mountains of Antarctica just east of Mount Smithson to enter the upper part of Gough Glacier. It was named by the Advisory Committee on Antarctic Names for Lieutenant Thomas W. Harwell, U.S. Navy, who participated in Naval Support Activity during Operation Deep Freeze 1964.

References

Glaciers of Dufek Coast